In Hong Kong, the Unofficial Members of the Executive Council (also Non-Official Members of the Executive Council) are a group of officials that do not hold office in the government but are appointed to advise and assist the Chief Executive, or during colonial period the Governor, in the Executive Council. These officials used to be provided with research and administrative assistance by the Office of the Unofficial Members of the Executive and Legislative Councils.

See also 
Executive Council of Hong Kong
List of Executive Council of Hong Kong unofficial members 1896–1941
List of Executive Council of Hong Kong unofficial members 1946–1997

References 

Executive Council of Hong Kong
Politics of Hong Kong